The 2015 International Tennis Tournament of Cortina was a professional tennis tournament played on clay courts. It was the 2nd edition of the tournament which was part of the 2015 ATP Challenger Tour. It took place in Cortina d'Ampezzo, Italy between 3 and 9 August 2015.

Singles main-draw entrants

Seeds

 1 Rankings are as of July 28, 2015.

Other entrants
The following players received wildcards into the singles main draw:
  Francisco Bahamonde
  Alessandro Giannessi 
  Gianluca Mager
  Gianluigi Quinzi

The following player received entry with a protected ranking:
  Javier Martí
  Pedro Sousa

The following players received entry from the qualifying draw:
  João Menezes
  Matteo Trevisan
  Agustín Velotti 
  Adelchi Virgili

Champions

Singles

  Paolo Lorenzi def.  Máximo González 6–3, 7–5

Doubles

  Paolo Lorenzi /  Matteo Viola def.  Lee Hsin-han /  Alessandro Motti 6–7(5–7), 6–4, [10–3]

External links
Official website

International Tennis Tournament of Cortina
International Tennis Tournament of Cortina
International Tennis Tournament of Cortina